Edred Utomi (born October 1, 1991) is an American stage actor known for playing Alexander Hamilton in the Angelica National Tour of Hamilton, Fritz in the West Coast premiere of The House Theatre of Chicago's The Nutcracker and the role of Peter in My Mañana Comes.

Life and career 
Utomi was born to Nigerian immigrants. He was raised in Las Vegas before relocating to attend University of San Diego. Utomi graduated with a communications degree before pursuing a career in musical theater.

Beginning his career in 2013, immediately after graduating from USD, Utomi has performed in U.S. regional theatre productions. Before being cast as Alexander Hamilton, he performed in plays throughout Southern California including Dr. Seuss' How the Grinch Stole Christmas! The Musical and A Midsummer Night's Dream.

Utomi expressed that Miranda's previous musical In The Heights motivated him to pursue a career in musical theatre. He was cast as Alexander Hamilton a year after taking on the understudy roles of the titular character, as well as Thomas Jefferson, Aaron Burr and George Washington. Utomi was attached to the role of Alexander Hamilton indefinitely in January 2019.

Stage credits

References

External links 
 
 

1991 births
21st-century American male actors
African-American male actors
American male musical theatre actors
Living people
Male actors from San Diego
University of San Diego alumni
American people of Nigerian descent
Male actors from Las Vegas